4 Runner was an American country music vocal group founded in 1993 by Craig Morris (lead vocals), Billy Crittenden (baritone vocals), Lee Hilliard (tenor vocals), and Jim Chapman (bass vocals). Signed to Polydor Records Nashville, the quartet released its self-titled debut album in 1995. It featured four charting singles on Hot Country Songs, the most successful being "Cain's Blood" at No. 26. Billy Simon took Crittenden's place just before a second album for A&M Records, which was not released despite producing a chart single, and the band broke up afterward. Chapman, Hilliard, and Morris reunited with third baritone singer Michael Lusk to release its next album, Getaway Car, on the Fresh label before disbanding a second time.

Biography
4 Runner was founded in 1993 by Jim Chapman (bass vocals), Billy Crittenden (baritone vocals), Lee Hilliard (tenor vocals), and Craig Morris (lead vocals). Crittenden was a former backing vocalist for Tanya Tucker, and Chapman is the brother-in-law of Christian singer Steven Curtis Chapman. In 1994, Diamond Rio had a Top 5 country hit with "Love a Little Stronger", which Billy Crittenden co-wrote, while Morris co-wrote "If I Had Only Known", an album cut for Reba McEntire. The group recorded a demo tape which was given to songwriter Larry Shell, who then submitted it to Mercury Records' Nashville branch. When that label chose to create a new division of Polydor Records for the country genre, 4 Runner was then signed to Polydor Nashville that year. Before releasing any material of their own, they sang backing vocals on then-labelmate Amie Comeaux's late-1994 debut album Moving Out.

"Cain's Blood", co-written by country-pop artist Michael Johnson and former Poco member Jack Sundrud, was issued as the lead single in early 1995. It reached a peak of No. 26 on the Billboard country music charts and No. 14 on the RPM country charts in Canada. The song also had a music video filmed at Hawaiʻi Volcanoes National Park, which was put into medium rotation on CMT. On the success of the single, the group's self-titled debut album was issued in May 1995. Four sides were cut for the album in September 1994, one of which was "Cain's Blood", and the rest of the album was then recorded between January and March 1995. Buddy Cannon, who produced the album with Shell, noted that he did not attempt to change the "vocal blend" present on the group's demo tape, and thus spent more time focusing on the musical arrangements and song selection. He also noted that the use of four-part vocal harmony made it more difficult to find suitable songs, compared to other country music groups where the vocal harmony is not as prominent. Polydor promoted the group via a showcase in Marina del Rey, California in which they, along with then-labelmates Chely Wright and Shane Sutton, performed before 80 radio representatives and 100 representatives of PolyGram Distribution. Three more singles were issued from 4 Runner: "A Heart with 4 Wheel Drive", "Home Alone", and "Ripples". While none of these reached Top 40 on the U.S. country music charts, "A Heart with 4 Wheel Drive" made No. 18 on the RPM Country Tracks charts in Canada.

Crittenden quit the group in October 1995 to focus more on a recording studio and publishing company which he owned at the time, and he was quickly replaced by Billy Simon, who made his debut at a concert in Pine Bluff, Arkansas that month. Due to a restructuring of Polydor Nashville, 4 Runner was transferred to A&M Records Nashville for what would have been its second album, One for the Ages. The lead single was "That Was Him (This Is Now)", written by Keith Urban and Vernon Rust. Although this song entered the country charts, the album itself was not released due to the closure of Polydor/A&M's Nashville unit. 4 Runner soon disbanded. During the band's hiatus, Chapman sang backing vocals on Chad Brock's 1998 self-titled debut album. They were also nominated in 1996 at the Academy of Country Music for the Top New Vocal Group award, along with Perfect Stranger and Lonestar, but lost to Lonestar.

Reunion and second disbanding
In 2002, Chapman, Hilliard, and Morris re-united, with Michael Lusk becoming the group's third baritone vocalist. They released an a cappella rendition of the Christmas song "What Child Is This?" late that year. A second album, Getaway Car, was released in 2003, producing a No. 59 single on the country charts with "Forrest County Line". The title track was later released by both The Jenkins and Hall & Oates. 4 Runner also provided background vocals on Craig Morgan's 2003 single "God, Family, and Country", which they also recorded on Getaway Car; also included on the album was the band's own version of "Love a Little Stronger". Shortly after Getaway Car was recorded, a single called "We Will Hope With You" was released although it was never put on an album.

4 Runner disbanded again after Getaway Car, and Morris, Simon, Lusk, and Hilliard became members of Loretta Lynn's road band. Crittenden is married to songwriter Pam "Sunny" Russ and is now a real estate agent in Missoula, Montana.

Discography

Albums

Singles

Music videos

Nominations
Academy of Country Music
 1995 Top New Vocal Duo or Group

References

A&M Records artists
Country music groups from Tennessee
Musical groups from Nashville, Tennessee
Vocal quartets
Musical groups established in 1993
Musical groups disestablished in 2005
Polydor Records artists
1993 establishments in Tennessee